The James W. Finch House, known also as the Finch-Fleischer House,  is a historic house in Monterey, California that is listed on the National Register of Historic Places (NRHP).

Located at 410 Monroe Street in Monterey, it was built in 1870.  The house is significant as one of few surviving examples of early American architecture in Monterey, as opposed to the Spanish/Mexican adobe style of other Monterey buildings of the same era.  The house includes Classical Revival stylings with other, eclectic stylistic features.

The house was built by rancher and stovemaker James William Finch and by Charles Finch for their mother, who lived in the house until 1881, after which James and his wife lived there and extended the house. James' daughter Alma and her husband Charles Fleischer lived there later. A notable later renter was artist Charles Rollo Peters.

The house was documented by the Historic American Buildings Survey in 1964. It was listed on the National Register of Historic Places in 1982.

References 

Houses on the National Register of Historic Places in California
Houses on the National Register of Historic Places in Monterey County, California
Neoclassical architecture in California
Houses completed in 1870
Houses in Monterey County, California
Buildings and structures in Monterey, California
National Register of Historic Places in Monterey County, California